Maxime Godart (born 2 October 1999) is a French actor.

Filmography

As actor
 2009: Le Petit Nicolas - Nicolas    
 2009: Les Meilleurs Amis du Monde - Bruce
 2019: Par un Regard (Short)

Television
 2010: Le Grand restaurant - Charles

References

External links
 Facebook
Interview
 Maxime Godart at l'Internet Movie Database

Living people
French male child actors
1999 births
People from Compiègne
French male film actors
French male television actors
French LGBT actors
French LGBT rights activists